Darrell Smith may refer to:
 Darrell K. Smith (1961–2017), wide receiver and slotback in the Canadian Football League
 Darrell M. Smith, American actor
 Darrell F. Smith (1927–2013), American politician, the Attorney General of Arizona

See also
 Daryl Smith (disambiguation)